Acacia spilleriana, commonly known as Spiller's wattle, is a shrub belonging to the genus Acacia and the subgenus Phyllodineae native to southern Australia.

Description
The branchlets are covered with a dense layer of fine hairs velvety citron hairs on older shoots and silvery white hairs on new shoots. It has small, grayish rounded phyllodes and spherical flower-heads of bright golden flowers on long stalks. The simple, axillary inflorescences are appear in pairs of globular flower-heads containing 30 to 40 bright yellow flowers.

Distribution
It is endemic only in a small area where it has a patchy and sparse distribution in South Australia from northern parts of the Mount Lofty Range from around Burra to Auburn in the north to around the southern parts of the Tothill Ranges in the south where it is found as a part of open Eucalyptus woodland and mallee communities. A population is also known at the southern tip of the Eyre Peninsula which is thought to be a naturalised population. The total area of occurrence is thought to be around  It is found on grows on rocky hills, along creeklines and on roadsides growing in duplex soils with loamy soils above red clay that are usually alkaline and well-drained.

See also
 List of Acacia species

References

spilleriana
Flora of South Australia
Plants described in 1886